William Hodgman may refer to:

William A. Hodgman (1884–1967), US naval officer
William Hodgman (prosecutor), American lawyer and prosecutor
Will Hodgman (born 1969), Tasmanian politician
Bill Hodgman (1909–1997), Tasmanian politician